Sweetheart of the Navy is a 1937 American comedy film directed by W. Duncan Mansfield and written by Carroll Graham. The film stars Eric Linden, Cecilia Parker, Roger Imhof, Bernadene Hayes, Don Barclay and Etta McDaniel. The film was released on June 8, 1937, by Grand National Films Inc.

Plot
A singer wants to make her naval port nightclub a success after being left with bills.

Cast           
Eric Linden as Eddie Harris
Cecilia Parker as Joan Whitney
Roger Imhof as Commander Lodge
Bernadene Hayes as Mazie
Don Barclay as Pete
Etta McDaniel as Lily
Reed Howes as Andrews
Eddy Waller as Krump 
Jason Robards Sr. as Bumper
Cully Richards as Andy
John T. Murray as Carson
Art Miles as Jack
Henry Roquemore as Jones
Fred Murray as Henry
Vance Carroll as Steve
Benny Burt as Fitch

References

External links
 

1937 films
American comedy films
1937 comedy films
Grand National Films films
American black-and-white films
1930s English-language films
1930s American films